Diabetes Care is a monthly peer-reviewed medical journal published since 1978 by the American Diabetes Association. The journal covers research in the following five categories: 1) clinical care/education/nutrition/psychosocial research, 2) epidemiology/health services research, 3) emerging treatments and technologies, 4) pathophysiology/complications, and 5) cardiovascular and metabolic risk. The journal also publishes clinically relevant review articles, letters to the editor, and commentaries.

The current Editor-in-Chief is Steven Kahn, MD.

The journal has a 2020 impact factor of 19.112.

See also 
 American Diabetes Association
 Diabetes

References

External links 
 

Publications established in 1978
Endocrinology journals
Monthly journals
English-language journals
Diabetes
Academic journals published by learned and professional societies